Sir William Massingberd, 3rd Baronet (1677 – 1723) of Gunby Hall, Lincolnshire was a British politician who sat in the House of Commons from 1721 to 1723.

He was the only son of Sir William Massingberd, 2nd Baronet and educated at Merchant Taylors’ School in 1690-1 and St Catharine's College, Cambridge. He inherited his baronetcy on his father's death in 1719.

Massingberd stood for parliament at Boston at a by-election in 1719, but was defeated. He was then elected Member of Parliament (MP) for Lincolnshire at a by-election in January 1721. He was successfully re-elected for Lincolnshire at the 1722 general election and sat until his death in 1723.

On Massingberd's unmarried death, the baronetcy became extinct and his estate, including Gunby Hall, passed to his nephew William Meux, who changed name to Massingberd as a condition of the inheritance, thereby becoming William Meux Massingberd.

References 

1677 births
1723 deaths
People from Lincolnshire
People educated at Merchant Taylors' School, Northwood
Alumni of St Catharine's College, Cambridge
Members of the Parliament of Great Britain for English constituencies
British MPs 1715–1722
Baronets in the Baronetage of England